Walid Khazen (also Walid el-Khazen; born 5 September 1946, in Beirut, Lebanon) is a Lebanese diplomat and a member of the noble Khazen family.

Education

Walid received his Bachelor's degree from the International College in Beirut, and he received licenses in French and Lebanese law from the University of Lyon and Saint Joseph University, respectively. In addition, he studied at University College London.

Work

He has served as a lawyer. He was the ambassador from the Sovereign Military Order of Malta to Jordan. He was awarded a Grand Cross in the Order pro Merito Melitensi in 2016.

Personal life

He is a member of the Maronite Church. He has a wife, Gloria, and four children (Sari, Chafic, Nour, and Tayma).

References

External links
 el-Khazen website

Walid
Ambassadors of the Sovereign Military Order of Malta
1946 births
Living people
Lebanese lawyers
Alumni of University College London
Saint Joseph University alumni
University of Lyon alumni
Lebanese Maronites
Recipients of the Order pro Merito Melitensi